Kixx may refer to:

 Kixx (U.S. Gold), a defunct budget video game label associated with former publisher U.S. Gold
 KIXX, a radio station broadcasting a Hot AC format serving the Watertown, South Dakota, USA area
 Philadelphia KiXX, an American indoor soccer team
 Kixx, also known as Experiment 601, a fictional alien character in Disney's Lilo & Stitch franchise

See also

 Kix (disambiguation)
 Kick (disambiguation), includes uses of the plural, "kicks"